The 1956 Yorkshire Cup was the forty-ninth occasion on which the rugby league competition known as the Yorkshire County Cup had been held. Featuring clubs from the 1956–57 Northern Rugby Football League season, matches were played over September and October 1956. Wakefield Trinity won the trophy by beating Hunslet in the final.

Background 

The Rugby League Yorkshire Cup competition was a knock-out competition between (mainly professional) rugby league clubs from  the  county of Yorkshire. The actual area was at times increased to encompass other teams from  outside the  county such as Newcastle, Mansfield, Coventry, and even London (in the form of Acton & Willesden. The Rugby League season always (until the onset of "Summer Rugby" in 1996) ran from around August-time through to around May-time and this competition always took place early in the season, in the Autumn, with the final taking place in (or just before) December (The only exception to this was when disruption of the fixture list was caused during, and immediately after, the two World Wars)

Competition and results 
This season there were no junior/amateur clubs taking part, no new entrants and no "leavers" and so the total of entries remained the  same at sixteen. This in turn resulted in no byes in the first round.

Round 1 
Involved  8 matches (with no byes) and 16 clubs

Round 2 - quarterfinals 
Involved 4 matches and 8 clubs

Round 3 – semifinals  
Involved 2 matches and 4 clubs

Final 
The 1956 Yorkshire Cup final was played between Wakefield Trinity and Hunslet. The match was played at Headingley, Leeds, now in West Yorkshire. The attendance was 31,147 and receipts were £5,609. This is the  last occasion on which the attendance at a Yorkshire Cup final would exceed 30,000. Wakefield won the match 23-5 to claim the trophy.

Teams and scorers 

Scoring - Try = three (3) points - Goal = two (2) points - Drop goal = two (2) points

The road to success

Notes and comments 
1 * The  attendance is given as 30,942 by the  Rothmans Rugby League Yearbook of 1991-92 and 1990-91 but 31,147 by "100 Years of Rugby. The History of Wakefield Trinity 1873-1973 by J C Lindley and D W Armitage and also by RUGBYLEAGUEproject

2 * Headingley, Leeds, is the home ground of Leeds RLFC with a capacity of 21,000. The record attendance was  40,175 for a league match between Leeds and Bradford Northern on 21 May 1947.

References

External links
Saints Heritage Society
1896–97 Northern Rugby Football Union season at wigan.rlfans.com
Hull&Proud Fixtures & Results 1896/1897
Widnes Vikings - One team, one passion Season In Review - 1896-97
The Northern Union at warringtonwolves.org

RFL Yorkshire Cup
Yorkshire Cup